King Ranch chicken is a Tex-Mex casserole. Its name comes from King Ranch, one of the largest ranches in the United States, although the actual history of the dish is unknown and there is no direct connection between the dish and the ranch. Recipes vary, but generally it has a sauce made of canned diced tomatoes with green chiles (commonly the Ro-Tel brand), cream of mushroom soup, cream of chicken soup, diced bell pepper, onion, and chunks or shreds of chicken. The bottom of the casserole is lined with corn tortillas or tortilla chips, then layered with sauce and topped with cheese.  This flavorful Tex-Mex dish has long been a favorite dish in Texas club cookbooks and lunchrooms.

See also
 List of casserole dishes
 List of chicken dishes

References

Casserole dishes
American chicken dishes
Tex-Mex cuisine